James McCann (31 October 1897 – 19 July 1983) was a 20th-century Anglican Bishop.

Born in Grantham on 31 October 1897 and educated at the Royal Belfast Academical Institution, Queen's University Belfast and Trinity College, Dublin (respondent 1926; B.D. 1935; Ph.D. 1944), he was ordained in 1920. He held curacies at Ballymena, Ballyclare, Cavan and Oldcastle.

He was Rector of Donaghpatrick from 1930 to 1936 and of St Mary's, Drogheda, from 1936 to 1945. He was Bishop of Meath from 1945 to 1959, then Archbishop of Armagh and Primate of All Ireland from 1959 to 1969. He died on  19 July 1983.

Notes

1897 births
1983 deaths
Burials in Oxfordshire
People from Grantham
People educated at the Royal Belfast Academical Institution
Alumni of Queen's University Belfast
Alumni of Trinity College Dublin
Anglican bishops of Meath
20th-century Anglican archbishops
Anglican archbishops of Armagh
British expatriate archbishops